Shiozawa (written: 塩沢) is a Japanese surname. Notable people with the surname include:

, Japanese voice actor
, Imperial Japanese Navy admiral
, Japanese footballer
, Japanese footballer

Fictional characters
, a character in the manga series Urara Meirocho

See also
Shiozawa Station, a railway station in Minamiuonuma, Niigata Prefecture, Japan
Shiozawa, Niigata, a former town in Minamiuonuma District, Niigata Prefecture, Japan

Japanese-language surnames